Stahleckeriidae is a family of dicynodont therapsids whose fossils are known from the Triassic of North America, South America, Asia and Africa.

Classification

Phylogeny
Below is a cladogram from Kammerer et al. (2013):

Genera

References

Kannemeyeriiformes
Induan first appearances
Norian extinctions
Prehistoric therapsid families